Jobstown is an unincorporated community located within Springfield Township in Burlington County, New Jersey, United States. The area is served as United States Postal Service ZIP code 08041.

As of the 2000 United States Census, the population for ZIP Code Tabulation Area 08041 was 877.

County Route 537 is the main route through Jobstown. CR 670 also comes through the community with a short concurrency with CR 537. Rancocas Stable was an American thoroughbred horse racing stable and stud farm located in Jobstown. Other places in Jobstown include a post office, churches, Springfield Township municipal offices and park, and small businesses. Jobstown was once a stop on the Kinkora Branch railroad.

Demographics

Notable people
People who were born in, residents of, or otherwise closely associated with Jobstown include:
Irving Fryar, former NFL wide receiver.

See also
Kauffman & Minteer Inc.

References

External links

Census 2000 Fact Sheet for ZIP Code Tabulation Area 08041 from the United States Census Bureau

Populated places in the Pine Barrens (New Jersey)
Springfield Township, Burlington County, New Jersey
Unincorporated communities in Burlington County, New Jersey
Unincorporated communities in New Jersey